The Sint-Erasmus hospital is a former hospital that was located at 33 Fonteinstraat in Antwerp, Belgium. In Dutch, it was known as Sint-Erasmusgasthuis.

Second World War 
In August 1942, Antwerp Governor Jan Grauls declared, by order of the occupying authorities, that the Sint-Erasmus hospital was the only hospital in Antwerp in which it was still allowed to treat Jewish patients. In addition to this, Jewish doctors were the only doctors who were allowed to treat Jewish patients, with the exception of life-threatening cases. The hospital had a closed ward, reserved for the care of Jews. In all other municipal and private hospitals and sanatoriums, it became forbidden to treat Jews.

Hidden Jewish children 

On September 21, 1942, the German Sicherheitspolizei und Sicherheitsdienst (Sipo-SD) raided three Antwerp orphanages: Meisjeshuis (Antwerp), Pennsylvania Foundation and Jongenshuis. In Meisjeshuis, all 25 Jewish orphans who had already reached the age of five were arrested and taken to the Dossin barracks, the former transit camp in Mechelen. The entire group was deported and gassed upon arrival in Auschwitz-Birkenau. The youngest of 14 Jewish children of Meisjeshuis had not been arrested during a raid on September 21, 1942. They were still staying at the department of Kinderkribbe Good Engels. In a series of rescue actions, a total of 10 Jewish children were taken from there to the Sint-Erasmus hospital, where they all went into hiding. Among these children were Risa Schwartz and Jacques Weisser. Eventually, most of the Jewish children were found by the Germans and arrested in the hospital, but 9 out of the 10 rescued children survived the war.

Bill Frankenstein (born as Bernard Baron) and Werner Szydlow, two of the rescued children, described their stay in the hospital as follows:

   

  

In October 1944, the hospital was damaged by V-bombs, and later, the building was demolished.

References

External links
 Van het kindertehuis naar de gaskamer: 40 Antwerpse kinderen bleken niet veilig
 Brownstein: Holocaust child survivors reconnect seven decades after arriving in Montreal
 ‘Het loont nog altijd om te blijven zoeken’
 Orphaned in Holocaust, Belgian survivors reunite over 70 years later
 Holocaust Memorial Day: They were rescued from deportation. Now, Jewish orphans reunite.

The Holocaust in Belgium
Buildings and structures in Antwerp
Demolished buildings and structures in Belgium